Aosafur Rahman is a Bangladesh Nationalist Party politician and the former Member of Parliament of Khulna-11.

Career
Rahman was elected to parliament from Khulna-11 as a Bangladesh Nationalist Party candidate in 1979.

References

Bangladesh Nationalist Party politicians
Living people
2nd Jatiya Sangsad members
Year of birth missing (living people)